Parviz Meshkatian (Persian: پرويز مشكاتيان; May 15, 1955  – September 21, 2009) was an  Iranian musician, composer, researcher and university lecturer.

Biography 
Born in Nishapur, Meshkatian entered the Tehran Academy of Arts, where he studied music theory and was introduced to radif (the Persian classical music repertoire) by the masters Nour Ali Boroumand, Dariush Safvat, Mohammad Taghi Massoudieh, and Mehdi Barkeshli. He focused on the radif of Mirza Abdollah for santur and setar.

Meshkatian was one of the founding members of the Aref Ensemble, founded in 1977, as well as the Sheyda Ensemble. He was also one of the founding members of the Chavosh Artistic and Cultural Foundation. The Chavosh foundation has played a major role in the development of Iranian music for a few decades .     

Meshkatian toured Europe and Asia and regularly performed in countries such as France, Germany, England, Sweden, Netherlands, and Denmark. In the spring of 1982 he published the book Twenty Pieces for Santour. In spring of 1992 Meshkatian and the Aref Ensemble won the first prize of the Spirit of the Earth Festival in England. Meshkatian's collaboration with Mohammad Reza Shajarian produced some of the most beautiful recordings of contemporary Persian traditional music. While continuing his work as a composer and a researcher, Meshkatian was teaching music at Tehran University.

Meshkatian died on September 21, 2009, in Tehran, from a heart attack.

Discography

References

External links

Official Website.
 Santur virtuoso Parviz Meshkatian passes away at 54, in English, Mehr News Agency, Monday, 21 September 2009, .
 Parviz Meshkatian, the Iranian musician and composer, died, in Persian, BBC Persian, Monday 21 September 2009, .
 Meshkatian was a Santour prodigy, in Persian, Mehr News Agency, Monday, 21 September 2009, .
 Funeral ceremony held for Parviz Meshkatian, in Persian, IRNA, Thursday, 24 September 2009, .Note: According to this report, after the ceremony in Tehran, the body of Parviz Meshkatian has been moved to Nishapur, where he will buried in a cemetery adjacent to the tomb of Attar Neyshabouri on Saturday 26 September 2009.
 Mehdi Setāyeshgar, The Master of Eternal Mezrābs, in Persian, Jadid Online, Friday, 25 September 2009, .An audio slideshow by Bahār Navā'i, Jadid Online:  (3 min).
 Meshkatian burial ceremony of Meshkatian in Neyshabour september 2009 
 Meshkatian tomb stone near Attar garden
 Meshkatian died: The mournful at the funeral ceremony of Meshkatian, a collection of 18 photographs, Mardomak, Friday, 25 September 2009, .
Albums Available at Amazon.

1955 births
2009 deaths
Musicians from Nishapur
Iranian composers
Iranian santur players
Persian classical musicians
Academic staff of the University of Tehran